Ndam, also known as Dam and Ndamm, is an Afro-Asiatic language spoken in the southwestern Chadian prefectures of Tandjilé and Lai. Most of the speakers generally practice traditional religions, Islam, or Christianity. There are two dialects of Ndam—northern and southern, respectively—Ndam Dik, and Ndam-Ndam.

References 

East Chadic languages
Languages of Chad